The Philadelphia Flyers are a professional ice hockey team based in Philadelphia, Pennsylvania. They are members of the Metropolitan Division of the National Hockey League's (NHL) Eastern Conference. The Flyers were founded in 1967 as one of six expansion teams, increasing the size of the NHL at that time to 12 teams.

As of the 2022 NHL Entry Draft, the Flyers have selected 63 goaltenders and 446 skaters (forwards and defensemen) in the NHL Entry Draft since their first draft in 1967. They selected an additional 3 goaltenders and 7 skaters from 1986 to 1994 in the short-lived NHL Supplemental Draft, which was for selecting collegiate players who were not eligible for the standard Entry Draft. As of the completion of the 2021–22 season, 214 Flyers draft picks have appeared in at least one NHL game.

The Flyers are one of the few teams to have never earned the right to draft first overall by means of having the worst record in the league. Though they had the worst record during the  season, they dropped to the second overall pick after the Chicago Blackhawks won the draft lottery. The only time the Flyers have picked first overall was in 1975 when they acquired the pick from the Washington Capitals, trading Bill Clement, Don McLean, and the Flyers first-rounder (18th overall) so they could select Mel Bridgman.

Key
 Played at least one game with the Flyers
 Spent entire NHL career with the Flyers
() Inducted into the Hockey Hall of Fame
() Number retired by the Flyers

Statistics are complete to the end of the 2021–22 NHL season.

Draft picks

Goaltenders

Skaters

See also
1967 NHL Expansion Draft

References

 
draft picks
Philadelphia Flyers